Essar Hazira Power Plant is a gas-based thermal power plant located near at Hazira in Surat district in the Indian state of Gujarat. The power plant is operated by the Essar Energy.

Natural gas-fired power stations in Gujarat
Surat district
Year of establishment missing